is a Japanese actress, voice actress, and singer from Saitama, Japan. She is also a member of the singing group COACH☆.

Filmography

Anime
 Suzuka (Voice of Honoka Sakurai)
 Saint October (Voice of Artista)
 Hoshizora Kiseki (Voice of Kozue)

External links
 Official website  
 COACH Main Page 
 

1981 births
Living people
Japanese voice actresses
Musicians from Saitama Prefecture
Voice actresses from Saitama Prefecture
21st-century Japanese singers
21st-century Japanese women singers